Mudigubba is a town and mandal headquarters in Sri Sathya Sai district of the Indian state of Andhra Pradesh.
It is located in Mudigubba mandal of Dharmavaram revenue division.

Geography 
It has an average elevation of 395 metres (1299 ft)

Demographics 
According to Indian census, 2001 the demographic details of Mudigubba mandal is as follows:
 Total Population: 	58,212	in 13,894 Households.
 Male Population: 	29,834	and Female Population: 	28,378
 Children Under 6-years of age: 	6,749	(Boys -	3,520 and Girls – 3,229)
 Total Literates: 	26,691

References 

Cities and towns in Sri Sathya Sai district
Mandal headquarters in Sri Sathya Sai district